Comarca del Arlanza is a comarca located south-east of the province of Burgos in the autonomous community of Castile and León. It is bounded on the north by the Odra-Pisuerga and the Alfoz de Burgos, south by the Ribera del Duero, on the east by the province of Palencia and west by the Sierra de la Demanda.

Administrative Entities
The comarca capital is Lerma.

Municipalities
There are 44 municipalities:

Geography
The waters of the river Arlanza originate in the pines forest of Quintanar de la Sierra and flow from East to West. This is due to the fact that the land descends from heights such as Peñas de Cervera (Mount Valdosa, 1412 m) and The Mamblas (1372 m) to the border with Palencia. The comarca receives an average of 647 mm of water, which is an appreciable amount for Burgos.

Most of its soil is dedicated to the sow of the cereal, consequence of a long process of rupture of great extensions of Pines, oaks, junipers and other species that covered enormous extensions. So it is testified by the comarcal names: Pineda Trasmonte, Pinedillo, Nebreda, Avellanosa, Torrecítores del Enebral, Madrigal del Monte, Madrigalejo del Monte o Villamayor de los Montes. Long ago there was a big vegetal charcoal production.

Communications 
Freeways are acceptable: from North to South crosses the national N-I from Madrid to Irun and from west to east the N-622 from Lerma to Palencia. The others comarcal roads are:
 BU-101 from Villahoz to Villaquirán (A-62)
 BU-114 from Quintanilla de la Mata (A-1) to Villafruela
 BU-900 from Lerma to Silos
 BU-901 from Cuevas de San Clemente (N-234) to Silos
 BU-904 from Lerma (A-1) to Covarrubias
 BU-905 from Covarrubias to Hortigüela (N-234)
 BU-910 from Hacinas (N-234) to Caleruega
The train connection between Madrid and Burgos is not very useful due to its neglected state.

History

The Arlanza zone was repopulated mainly by Astur, Cantabri, Visigothic and Mozarab peoples in the mid-ninth century, after the border of the County of Castile and the Kingdom of Córdoba reached the river Duero.

Relevant towns
Villa Rachela de Covarrubias, an artistic historic place and the old capital of a religious state; Villa Ducal de Lerma, which was turned by the eponymous Duke into one of the most beautiful urban sets in Spain; Santa María del Campo, the old capital of Betherías.

See also

 Province of Burgos

Notes

External links
 Arlanza.com - cultural & rural website
 website of the Province of Burgos delegation

Comarcas of the Province of Burgos